Liam Tarquin Broady (born 4 January 1994) is a British professional tennis player.

Early and personal life
Broady, the younger brother of fellow tennis player Naomi Broady, has another sister, Emma and a brother, Calum. The family grew up in Heaton Chapel, Stockport. Their parents, Shirley and Simon, took the young Liam and Naomi to tennis tournaments.

Broady started playing table tennis at the age of four and went to Matchpoint in Bramhall for lessons. His first tournament was at the age of eight and he showed potential at ten.

He attended Norris Bank primary and Priestnall School where he completed his GCSEs in 2010.

In 2007, the Lawn Tennis Association suspended his seventeen-year-old sister Naomi's funding, for 'unprofessional' postings on a social networking site. Their father Simon was so angry with the decision that he withdrew Liam, then aged thirteen, from the LTA programme. Simon sold the family home and downsized to a modest red brick terrace to fund their travel and coaching.
Two weeks later, the LTA offered to restore their funding, but Simon refused, and they trained at the Mouratoglou Tennis Academy on the outskirts of Paris.

In 2012, Broady decided to accept help from the LTA, leading to his estrangement from his father, and they did not speak to each other for several years. When Liam returned to Stockport, he stayed with his sister Emma. In November 2015, Broady ended his LTA funding to heal the rift with his father, and he now funds himself, renting his own flat in the Heatons, Stockport. Broady trained at the Northern Tennis Club, David Lloyd Fitness and Life Leisure by Broadstone Mill.
Broady played Davis Cup for the 2018 tie against Spain, while Naomi Broady has declined to play Fed Cup for Great Britain.

In late 2016 he moved his training base to the University of Bath and is currently coached by Dave Sammel.

Broady is an avid Manchester City F.C. fan.

Junior career

In 2005 Broady won the Natwest Dorset Open which marked the start of his career. 

In 2008, he was crowned European Masters under-14 champion in Orbetello, Italy – a title once won by Rafael Nadal. 

At the 2010 Wimbledon Championships, Broady partnered Tom Farquharson to the final where they defeated fellow Britons Lewis Burton and George Morgan. The pair became the first British partnership to win the title since 1995. 

At Wimbledon in 2011, Broady beat Germany's Robin Kern 7–6 (7–4) 4–6 13–11 to reach the semifinals of the boys' singles and followed that victory with another against Australian Jason Kubler with the match ending 6–4 6–3 in the Brit's favour to ensure a place in the final. He lost in the final 6–2 4–6 2–6 to Australian Luke Saville. Broady finished 2011 by partnering Joshua Ward–Hibbert to the Dunlop Orange Bowl doubles title.

The 2012 season saw Broady win the Boys' Doubles at the Australian Open with Joshua Ward-Hibbert, reach the boys' semifinals at the US Open 2012 for the first time, and go on to make the final, where he lost against Filip Peliwo 2–6, 6–2, 5–7 in a tightly fought match.

As a junior Broady has reached as high as No. 2 in the junior combined world rankings in March 2012.

Junior Slam results – Singles
French Open: 3R (2012)
Wimbledon: F (2011)
US Open: F (2012)

Junior Slam results – Doubles
Australian Open: W (2012)
French Open: QF (2012)
Wimbledon: W (2010)
US Open: QF (2011)

Professional career

2009–2010
In 2009, at the age of 15, Broady began playing on the Futures Circuit, both in singles and doubles. In July 2009, Broady won his first main draw singles match against the 19-year-old Duncan Mugabe at the GB F8 in Felixstowe. In 2010, Broady beat four adult players on the Futures tour.

2011
In February 2011, Broady reached the semifinals of the France F3 in Bressuire. In July 2011, Broady won his first doubles title with Dan Evans at the Chiswick GB Futures F11. Elsewhere, he lost the first or second rounds in 13 out of 18 singles tournaments. Broady was coached by Mark Hilton at Nottingham.

2012
Broady's difficulties continued with 7 first round defeats, and he considered giving up. So, now eighteen years old, he left the Mouratoglou Tennis Academy to accept funding from the LTA, causing a rift with his father, and they did not speak to each other until 2015. Mark Hilton became his full-time coach. In November, Broady made the semifinals of the USA F30 in Florida.

2013
Broady reached three singles and seven doubles finals at Futures level, winning one singles title and four doubles titles with partner Joshua Ward-Hibbert, including three on home soil. He began competing more regularly on the Challenger Tour, and as a result saw his ranking rise more steadily.

2014: First Challenger final, Top 200 debut
Broady, having added David Sammel to his team appeared in his first Challenger final in November, facing James Duckworth in the final of the Charlottesville Challenger, where he ultimately lost in three sets; however, his run to the final launched him into the top 200 for the first time, with a career-high ranking of No. 188 in the world. Throughout 2014, Broady's ranking rose up 271 places from No. 470 at the beginning of the year, becoming the 3rd ranked British player.

2015: Grand Slam debut and first singles win

He came from two sets down to win his first singles match as a wildcard at Wimbledon against Marinko Matosevic. He lost in the second round to David Goffin.

2016: Loss of form
In February, Broady won the Great Britain F1 Futures held in Glasgow. On the Challenger circuit, he appeared in the Tapei semi final, and two quarter finals. He was defeated in the first round of Wimbledon by British number one Andy Murray. It was the first all-British meeting at the All England Club since Tim Henman beat Martin Lee in 2001.

2017: Challenger Tour success: Two finals, return to top 200 
At the 2017 St. Petersburg Open in September, Broady qualified for the main draw to become the first Team Bath Tennis player to reach the quarterfinals of an ATP World Tour singles tournament. He followed that up by finishing runner-up in the Las Vegas Tennis Open, an ATP Challenger Tour event, in October.

2018: Davis Cup debut, loss of form
Broady lost in the first round of qualifying draw for the Australian Open, marking seven failures to qualify for Grand Slam main draws in seven attempts.

In February, Broady made his Davis Cup debut representing Great Britain. He performed well but lost in straight sets to Albert Ramos Viñolas, leaving the British team 0–1 down against Spain.

In March, Broady qualified for the first round of the 2018 Miami Open main draw, for the first time at the Masters 1000 level. He defeated Bjorn Fratangelo in straight sets to reach for the first time, the second round at a Masters.

2018 was predominantly a disappointing year. Liam went out of Wimbledon in the first round against Milos Raonic who went on to reach the quarter finals, and despite reaching the Quarter Finals in two US Challenger tournaments in Aptos and Stockton, Liam ended the year ranked Number 273 in the world.

2019: Challenger final, Wimbledon near-miss 
Liam reached his fourth Challenger final in April, winning five matches including against future top 50 star Alexander Bublik before losing 6–4 4–6 6–3 to Blaz Rola.

His attempt to qualify for the 2019 Wimbledon Championships was cruelly denied. After victories over Andrej Martin and Tallon Griekspoor he led Frenchman Grégoire Barrère by two sets to love before being pegged back to lose 3–6 0–6 6–2 6–4 6–3.

Liam ended the season on a high reaching the Knoxville Challenger semi final following wins over Americans Donald Young and Marcos Giron losing to eventual Champion Michael Mmoh, which meant he finished the year ranked 240.

2020: COVID affected year ends in French Open debut & fifth Challenger final 
Liam reached a Challenger semi final in Calgary, Canada, losing to Maxime Cressy before the tennis season was suspended due to COVID.

After the sport returned he stormed into the main draw of 2020 French Open, his first Grand slam qualification with wins over Nicola Kuhn (6–4 7–6), Botic van de Zandschulp 7-6 7-6 and Marc Polmans 7-6 6-4 
He was beaten in the first round by Czech Jiří Veselý 6–2 5–7 6–3 6–2.

He ended the year by reaching his fifth Challenger final in Parma, Italy, losing to German Cedrik-Marcel Stebe 6–4 6–4.

2021: First Challenger title and two more finals, Top 150 & Olympics debut 
Following a lengthy break due to the Coronavirus pandemic, Broady started the new season well reaching consecutive ATP Challenger finals and qualifying for the first round of the Miami Masters main draw. Consequently, Broady entered the top 150 for the first time in his career reaching a career-high singles ranking of No. 137 on 19 April 2021.

He played in a doubles partnership with Andy Murray in the 2021 Italian Open (tennis) in Rome in May. They beat Australians Max Purcell and Luke Saville in the first round, but were beaten by Kevin Krawietz and Horia Tecău in the second round.

He received a wildcard to enter the 2021 Wimbledon Championships, and reached the second round for a second time in his career, defeating Marco Cecchinato in straight sets.

Ranked 143rd in the world, Broady upset seventh seeded Wimbledon semi-finalist and World No. 12 Hubert Hurkacz at the Olympics, his biggest win in his career, in order to reach the third round.

In September, he finally secured his first ATP Challenger title in Biel/ Bienne in Switzerland after losing his previous seven Challenger finals. He won all five matches without dropping a set defeating Marc-Andrea Hüsler 7-5 6-3  in the final in front of the Swiss man's home crowd. This win moved Broady to a career high 126 in the world and inside the top 100 in the ATP Race denoting performances in 2021 alone.

2022: Wimbledon third round

Broady made a successful start to the 2022 season, having been captain of the GB team at the 2022 ATP Cup, his opening tournament saw him qualify for the 2022 Australian Open with three come-from behind wins against Kacper Zuk 4–6 6–1 6–2, J. J. Wolf 3–6 6–4 6–4 and Roman Safiullin 4–6 7–6 (2) 6–2. He drew Australian Nick Kyrgios in the first round and lost 4–6 4–6 3–6.

At the 2022 Wimbledon Championships he recorded two Major wins as a wildcard, to reach the third round for the first time at a Grand Slam, over Lukáš Klein and 12th seed Diego Schwartzman both matches going to five sets.

Singles performance timeline

Current through the 2022 Tel Aviv Open.

ATP Challenger and ITF Futures finals

Singles: 22 (9–13)

Doubles: 28 (13–15)

Junior Grand Slam finals

Singles: 2 (0–2)

Doubles: 2 (2–0)

Record against top 10 players
Broady's record against players who have been ranked in the top 10, with those who are active in boldface. Only ATP Tour main draw matches are considered:

References

External links

English male tennis players
Sportspeople from Stockport
Australian Open (tennis) junior champions
Wimbledon junior champions
British male tennis players
Olympic tennis players of Great Britain
1994 births
Living people
Grand Slam (tennis) champions in boys' doubles
Tennis players at the 2020 Summer Olympics